The 1982 Memphis State Tigers football team represented Memphis State University (now known as the University of Memphis) as an independent during the 1982 NCAA Division I-A football season. In its second season under head coach Rex Dockery, the team compiled a 1–10 record (0–4 against conference opponents) and was outscored by a total of 284 to 129. The team played its home games at Liberty Bowl Memorial Stadium in Memphis, Tennessee. 

The team's statistical leaders included Trell Hooper with 1,194 passing yards and 30 points scored, Richard Williams with 480 rushing yards, and Derrick Crawford with 523 receiving yards.

Schedule

References

Memphis State
Memphis Tigers football seasons
Memphis State Tigers football